Erindale Shopping Centre is a large shopping centre located in the Tuggeranong suburb of Wanniassa in the Canberra region of Australia. It stands on the former site of the Erindale Homestead for which it is named, and comprises  of both indoor and outdoor land with 76 stores, restaurants, cafes, and entertainment venues.

History
Erindale Shopping Centre was first developed in 1985, two years before the Tuggeranong Hyperdome. It was intended as a “district retail centre”, to serve the Tuggeranong area. The land mass of Erindale was initially gazetted by the ACT Government with many independent retailers purchasing properties, but was later purchased by Charter Hall and operated as a neighbourhood shopping centre under their name. In the early 2010s, the centre was revitalised to include a new bus station, which was serviced as a terminus by several of ACTION's southbound bus routes, and a modernised facade, as well as the addition of three new retail locations inside the indoor building on Denigan Street.

In 2019, Savills invested an undisclosed amount into the Centre, purchasing its operations and managing it independently.

References

Extra reading

 Greens succeed in getting the government to develop a master plan for Erindale.

 opposition to a second supermarket
 Shopping centre was refurbished in 2001.
 A new community garden between Erindale College and the Shops was organised by Communities@Work, Gugan Gulwan Youth Aboriginal Corporation and ACT Department of Territory and Municipal Services. 
 The ACT government failed to sell the site of the Erindale Police Station.
 The Ngunnawal ACT and District Indigenous Peoples Aboriginal Corporation planned to move to the former police station.
 Obstetrician Doug Lee opened the Erindale Medical Practice in the late 1980s; recently tried to recruit doctors for it on YouTube.
 A cryptosporidium outbreak scare closed Erindale pool on 4 February 1998.

Canberra urban places
Shopping centres in the Australian Capital Territory
Shopping malls established in 1985
1985 establishments in Australia